This list contains all the clubs that became Brazilian champions in women's football.

Taça Brasil (1983–1992)

Tournament organized directly by the state federations.

Campeonato Brasileiro (1993–2001)

Direct continuation of the previous championship, but now organized by the CBF.

Taça Brasil (2006–2007)

Tournament organized by the LINAF - Liga Nacional de Futebol Feminino.

Copa do Brasil de Futebol Feminino (2007–2016)

Despite the name and format being a cup, due to the absence of a league at that time, it was in fact the main Brazilian women's football competition. Organized by the CBF.

Campeonato Brasileiro Série A1 (2013–present)

The current Brazilian Women's Championship, Organized by the CBF. It was less important than the 2013-2016 Copa do Brasil, but with its extinction, it became the main competition of the category since 2017.

List of Champions

Champions by state

Notes

See also
List of Brazilian football champions

References

 
 
Champions
Brazil